Bircham Newton is the smallest of the three villages that make up the civil parish of Bircham, in the west of the English county of Norfolk. The village is located about 1 km north of the larger village of Great Bircham, 20 km north-east of the town of King's Lynn, and 60 km north-west of the city of Norwich. In 1931 the parish had a population of 487. On 1 April 1935 the parish was abolished to form Bircham.

The villages name means 'Bircham's new farm/settlement'.

Bircham Newton gave its name to an airfield, RAF Bircham Newton, that was in use through World War II and into the 1960s. From 1966 until 2020 the airfield was the home of the Construction Industry Training Board. In February 2020, the CITB announced it had sold its training provision to West Suffolk College, based in Bury St Edmunds, aiming to continue construction industry training provision at the site.

War Memorial
Bircham Newton's war memorial is located inside All Saints' church alongside a slightly damaged Roll of Honour. It lists the following names for the First World War:
 Lance-Corporal Reginald H. Cooper (1893-1917), 8th Battalion, Royal Norfolk Regiment
 Private Jacob Osborne (1894-1918), 2/4th Battalion, Duke of Wellington's Regiment

References

External links

.
Information from Genuki Norfolk on Bircham Newton.
The Hauntings of Bircham Newton

Villages in Norfolk
Former civil parishes in Norfolk
King's Lynn and West Norfolk